Joseph Taylor (1913 - death date unknown) was a professional baseball second baseman in the Negro leagues. He played with the St. Louis Stars in 1937.

References

External links
 and Seamheads

St. Louis Stars (1937) players
1913 births
Year of death missing
Baseball catchers
Baseball players from Mississippi
Baseball infielders